Marcos Aurélio dos Santos, usually known as Macula (born May 22, 1968), is a retired association footballer who played midfielder who played for several Série A clubs.

Career
Born in Rio de Janeiro, he started his career playing for Bangu's youth squad, moving to the main team in 1986, playing 26 Série A games and scoring a goal before leaving the club in 1988. He played 35 Série A games and scored one goal for Fluminense between 1990 and 1991, and played five games while defending Vasco da Gama in 1992. While playing for Palmeiras in 1993 and in 1994, he won twice the Campeonato Paulista and the Série A, and won the Torneio Rio-São Paulo in 1993. Macula played six Série A games for Remo in 1994, and seven Série A games for Bahia in 1995.

Honors
Palmeiras
Série A: 1993, 1994
Torneio Rio-São Paulo: 1993
Campeonato Paulista: 1993, 1994

References

1968 births
Living people
Brazilian footballers
CR Vasco da Gama players
Clube do Remo players
Esporte Clube Bahia players
Fluminense FC players
Sociedade Esportiva Palmeiras players
Bangu Atlético Clube players
Campeonato Brasileiro Série A players
Footballers from Rio de Janeiro (city)
Association football midfielders